Chaetophora elegans is the type species in the algae genus Chaetophora.

Its EPPO code is KHREL.

References 

 Proton and metal binding capacity of the green freshwater alga Chaetophora elegans. AD Andrade, MCE Rollemberg, JA Nóbrega - Process Biochemistry, 2005
 Biosorption of methylene blue by chaetophora elegans algae: Kinetics, equilibrium and thermodynamic studies. MM El Jamal, MC Ncibi - Acta Chim. Slov, 2012
 Biosorption of crystal violet by Chaetophora elegans alga. RS Rammel, SA Zatiti, MM El Jamal - Journal of the University of Chemical, 2011

External links 
 

Chaetophoraceae
Plants described in 1783